Vice admiral Edzard Jacob van Holthe (29 January 1896 – 17 July 1967) was a Dutch military officer who served as Chairman of the United Defence Staff of the Armed Forces of the Netherlands between 1951 and 1953.

References

External links 
 

1896 births
1967 deaths
Royal Netherlands Navy admirals
Royal Netherlands Navy officers
Chiefs of the Defence Staff (Netherlands)